The 1956 Currie Cup was the 26th edition of the Currie Cup, the premier domestic rugby union competition in South Africa.

Fixtures and Results

Semi-final

Final

See also

 Currie Cup

References

1956
1956 in South African rugby union
Currie